A PPO inhibitor may inhibit two unrelated enzymes abbreviated "PPO". They are:

 Protoporphyrinogen oxidase inhibitors
 Polyphenol oxidase inhibitors

Biochemistry terminology